Eskilstuna is a city and the seat of Eskilstuna Municipality, Södermanland County, Sweden. The city of Eskilstuna had 67,359 inhabitants in 2015, with a total population of 100,092 inhabitants in Eskilstuna municipality (2014). Eskilstuna has a large Sweden Finn population. The town is located on the River Eskilstunaån, which connects Lake Hjälmaren and Lake Mälaren.

History 
Eskilstuna's history dates back to medieval times when English monk Saint Eskil made "Tuna" his base and diocese of the South coast of Lake Mälaren. Saint Eskil was buried in his monastery church in Tuna. Later the pagan city of Strängnäs was Christianised and was given the privilege of becoming diocese of South Lake Mälaren. Later "Eskil" was added in to the word "Tuna". However, the town of Eskilstuna did not receive municipal privileges due to its proximity to the medieval city of Torshälla. The monastery of Saint Eskil was completely destroyed by Swedish king Gustav Vasa during the Protestant Reformation and was replaced with the royal castle of Eskilstuna House.
The city's first city privileges were granted in 1659, and its boundaries included Tunafors and the newly founded town of Karl Gustavs Stad ("City of Karl Gustav"), located on the west side of the river.  Karl Gustavs Stad was built around the iron forges of master smith Reinhold Rademacher, encouraged by King Karl X Gustav. The first products of the forges were small arms and artillery.

Karl Gustavs Stad was a free town from 1771, where manufacturers and craftsmen were allowed to establish tax-free workshops and factories.  The town was merged with the rest of Eskilstuna in 1879. 

The city grew enormously during the Industrial Revolution and became one of the most important industrial cities of Sweden, earning the nickname "Stålstaden" ("The City of Steel"). Aside from firearms, the city also produced cutlery, scissors, keys, machine tools and precision instruments. As a tribute to the steel industry, the figure of a steel worker is included in the city's coat of arms. Eskilstuna is sometimes called The Sheffield of Sweden. Both cities at their peak were home to numerous steel production companies.

Economy 
Eskilstuna remains an important industrial city with internationally known companies such as Volvo Wheel loaders, main site for the heavy construction equipment division of Volvo, Assa (locks, keys), and Stainless steel manufacturer Outokumpu, Thin Strip Nyby in Torshälla.

Mälardalen University (Mälardalens högskola), founded in cooperation with the neighboring city of Västerås, has a campus in the city. The city also has a combined zoo and amusement park - Parken Zoo.

The hospital, Mälarsjukhuset is one of the largest in the region, employing around 3000 people.

Starting in 2012 the town has been pivoting towards a green economy, including biogas-powered public transit and cogeneration plants, seven-colored recycling bins (compared to the standard Swedish five), and a recycling center with an attached second-hand mall.

Climate
Eskilstuna has a climate transitioning between continental and maritime with vast seasonal differences for a Southern Swedish climate. Unlike the coastal part of the Sörmlandic region, Eskilstuna has higher diurnal temperature variation and stronger waves of either heat or cold. With regards to daytime maximum and minimum temperatures, the weather station has been operated since 1961 with a total of three breaks of 2-3 years apiece in between 1984 and 2008.

Demography 

As of December 31, 2019, Eskilstuna Municipality has a population of 106,859 people, making it the 15th largest municipality in Sweden.

Sport
The handball club Eskilstuna Guif plays in the national top division. They have reached the Swedish Championship final four times (1997, 2001, 2009 and 2011), but lost on each occasion. Eskilstuna is also home to EFK (Eskilstuna Flygklubb), Sweden's largest glider Flying Club which hosted the World Gliding Championships in 2006.

Since 2017, Eskilstuna has a football team in the highest tier Allsvenskan, named AFC Eskilstuna, who changed both the team name and location from Solna after qualifying for the top league after the 2016 season, making them the first team in the Swedish top leagues of football changing hometown. The women's football team, Eskilstuna United DFF, has played in the highest tier since 2014, and finished as runner up in the 2015 season, making them qualify for the 2016–17 UEFA Women's Champions League.

The speedway team in Eskilstuna, Smederna, competes in the highest speedway league in Sweden, Elitserien and race its home matches at Smedstadion outside Eskilstuna.

In eSports, Eskilstuna is home to CS:GO player Maikelele.

The stadium Tunavallen was a venue for the 1958 FIFA World Cup, hosting one match between Paraguay and Yugoslavia. It has also been used for several practice games for the Swedish National Youth Teams. Sports clubs using Tunavallen include AFC Eskilstuna, Eskilstuna United DFF, Eskilstuna City FK and IFK Eskilstuna. Eskilstuna Södra FF are based at Skogsängens IP and BK Sport is based at Ekängen.

Transport
Eskilstuna is served by the Svealandsbanan railway line between Stockholm and Hallsberg. European route E20 passes the city.

European Cooperation
Eskilstuna is a member city of Eurotowns network.

People

Music

Hel (band)
Kent  (band)
Pain of Salvation (band)
Anni-Frid Lyngstad
Mika "Gas" Ieppä
Towa Carson
Joakim Berg
Daniel Gildenlöw
Kristoffer Gildenlöw

Athletes 

Anna Nordqvist
Kent Carlsson
Kjell Johansson
Robert Andersson 
Tomas Gustafson
Tommy Jansson
Linnea Torstenson
Kristján Andrésson
Lars Sandberg
Joel Granfors

Footballers

Mika Väyrynen
Kennet Andersson 
Sebastian Larsson
Marcus Danielson

Other

Anna Nordqvist, professional golfer
Anna of Finland 
Carl Victor Heljestrand
Fredrik Lindström 
Yvonne Ryding, Miss Sweden 1984 and Miss Universe 1984
Bolinder-Munktell, a tractor manufacturer that merged with Volvo
Susanne Aalto, radio astronomer

See also 
 Eskilstunaån

References

External links 

 Official website (in Swedish, French, German, English and Finnish)
 Tågtider för Eskilstuna C

 
Finnish diaspora
Populated places in Södermanland County
Populated places in Eskilstuna Municipality
Municipal seats of Södermanland County
Swedish municipal seats
Cities in Södermanland County